Endotricha pyrrhocosma is a species of snout moth in the genus Endotricha. It was described by Alfred Jefferis Turner in 1911, and is known from Australia, Manovolka Island, and Woodlark Island.

References

Endotrichini
Moths of Australia
Moths of Papua New Guinea
Woodlark Islands
Moths described in 1911